Hans Döbrich (24 March 1916 – 6 April 1984) was a Luftwaffe fighter ace and recipient of the Knight's Cross of the Iron Cross during World War II. The Knight's Cross of the Iron Cross was awarded to recognise extreme battlefield bravery or successful military leadership. Hans Döbrich was credited with 65 victories. All his victories were recorded over the Eastern Front.

Career

Döbrich, as a member of 6./Jagdgeschwader 5 (JG 5), participated in battles on the northern flank of the Eastern Front in the Soviet Arctic. Döbrich made a good forced landing and then spent the next seven days walking back to the Staffel. On 16 July 1943, whilst flying Bf 109 G-6, Döebrich was wounded by enemy fighters after downing two aircraft and was forced to bail out into Petsamo Fjord, Finland. His combat career ended after a serious third wound to the face. His total victory tally was at least 65 victories achieved in 248 missions, an additional 19 victories were unconfirmed. All his victories were recorded over the Eastern Front.

Summary of career

Aerial victory claims
According to US historian David T. Zabecki, Döbrich was credited with 65 aerial victories.

Awards
 Iron Cross (1939) 2nd and 1st Class
 Wound Badge in Silver
 Front Flying Clasp of the Luftwaffe in Gold
 Ehrenpokal der Luftwaffe (17 August 1942)
 German Cross in Gold on 15 October 1942 as Unteroffizier in the 6./Jagdgeschwader 5
 Knight's Cross of the Iron Cross on 19 September 1943 as Feldwebel and pilot in the 6./Jagdgeschwader 5

References

Citations

Bibliography

 
 
 
 
 

1916 births
1984 deaths
Luftwaffe pilots
German World War II flying aces
Recipients of the Knight's Cross of the Iron Cross
Military personnel from Thuringia
Recipients of the Gold German Cross
People from Sonneberg (district)